In the Vineyard is an American-Canadian film series starring Rachael Leigh Cook and Brendan Penny. It airs on Hallmark Channel. The series debuted with the first of three films, Autumn in the Vineyard, premiering in 2016. The second installment in the series, Summer in the Vineyard, debuted in 2017. The third and final installment, Valentine in the Vineyard, aired around Valentine's Day 2019. The films follow the story of Francesca (Frankie) Baldwin and Nate DeLuca from feuding wineries in the town of St. Madeleine, California, as they are thrown together after their past romantic relationship that ended on a sour note.

The film series is based on the St. Helena Vineyard books by author Marina Adair.

Cast
Rachael Leigh Cook as Frankie Baldwin, a talented winemaker who has helped her father at the Baldwin family winery and sets out to make a mark for herself
Brendan Penny as Nate DeLuca, a budding chef who returns to use his college education to manage grape crops in a winery in his hometown
Laura Soltis as Carla DeLuca, matriarch of the DeLucas and Nate's mother
Michael Kopsa as Charles Baldwin, patriarch of the Baldwins and Frankie and Jonah's father. Tom Butler previously played the character in the first film.
Jeremy Guilbaut as Jonah Baldwin, the local police officer and Frankie's brother
Marcus Rosner as Marco DeLuca, Nate's brother and manager at the DeLuca winery
Ali Liebert as Hannah, Frankie's best friend and confidante and Marco's ex
Tegan Moss as Lexi, Frankie's cousin and a baker who moves to town and catches Marco's attention

Production
The first film was shot in River Stone winery near Oliver and Osoyoos in the South Okanagan Valley in British Columbia. The second installment of the film series, Summer in the Vineyard, was also shot in Okanagan Valley.

Films

References

External links

Hallmark Channel original films

American film series
Canadian film series
Canadian television films
Films based on American novels
Films shot in British Columbia
Films about wine